On the evening of 12 September 2020, a randomly-chosen man was fatally stabbed in a kebab restaurant in Morges, Vaud canton, Switzerland. The accused, a Turkish-Swiss dual national, was known to the Swiss intelligence service as an Islamist and under surveillance for possible links to terrorism. The victim was a 29-year-old Portuguese man. While in custody of the Swiss police, the accused is alleged to have confessed that he acted in the name of jihadism. Swiss authorities suspect a terrorist motive.

See also 
 2020 Lugano stabbing

References

2020 in Switzerland
Death in Switzerland
2020 stabbing
September 2020 crimes in Europe
September 2020 events in Switzerland
Stabbing attacks in 2020
Stabbing attacks in Switzerland
2020 crimes in Switzerland
2020 murders in Switzerland